Derrick Cooper (born 5 May 1955) is an English professional golfer. He turned professional in 1972. It took him some time to establish himself on the European Tour, but he held a tour card for sixteen consecutive seasons from 1984 and made the top-100 on the European Tour Order of Merit a total of 15 times, with a best ranking of 19th in 1989. He won his sole European Tour title at the 1988 Cepsa Madrid Open. He was a member of the PGA European Tour organisation's Board of Directors for seven years from 1998 and became a European Seniors Tour tournament referee in 2000.

Professional wins (3)

European Tour wins (1)

Other wins (2)
1983 Northern Open
1984 PGA Fourball Championship (with Denis Durnian, tied with Philip Posnett & Peter Hanna)

Results in major championships

Note: Cooper only played in The Open Championship.

CUT = missed the half-way cut
"T" indicates a tie for a place

Team appearances
Europcar Cup (representing England): 1988

References

External links

English male golfers
European Tour golfers
Sportspeople from Warrington
1955 births
Living people